The Four Advisors is a traditional Chinese asterism found in the Purple Forbidden enclosure. It consists of four stars found in the modern constellations of Ursa Minor and Camelopardalis and represents the four assistants of ancient emperors. During the Qing dynasty, a star from the constellation Draco was added to the asterism.

Astronomy in China